No Sleep 'til Belfast is a live Punk album by the band Stiff Little Fingers, released in 1988 (see 1988 in music).

Track listing
"Alternative Ulster" (Stiff Little Fingers, Gordon Ogilvie) – 3:08
"Roots, Radicals, Rockers and Reggae" (Bunny Wailer) – 4:29
"Silver Lining" (Stiff Little Fingers, Ogilvie) – 3:28
"Wait and See" (Burns, Ogilvie) – 4:46
"Gotta Gettaway" (Stiff Little Fingers, Ogilvie) – 4:19
"Just Fade Away" (Stiff Little Fingers, Ogilvie) – 3:27
"Wasted Life" (Burns) – 3:57
"The Only One" (Stiff Little Fingers, Ogilvie) – 4:24
"Nobody's Hero" (Burns, Ogilvie) – 4:49
"At the Edge" (Stiff Little Fingers) – 4:06
"Listen" (Stiff Little Fingers) – 4:02
"Barbed Wire Love" (Stiff Little Fingers, Ogilvie) – 4:02
"Fly the Flag" (Stiff Little Fingers, Ogilvie) – 4:21
"Tin Soldiers" (Stiff Little Fingers, Ogilvie) – 5:07
"No Sleep 'til Belfast" (Stiff Little Fingers) – 2:37
"Suspect Device" (Stiff Little Fingers, Ogilvie) – 4:11
"Johnny Was" (Bob Marley) – 8:45

Personnel
Stiff Little Fingers
Jake Burns – vocals/guitar
Dolphin Taylor – drums
Henry Cluney – guitar
Ali McMordie – bass

References 

1988 live albums
Stiff Little Fingers live albums